In a Reverie is the debut studio album by Italian gothic metal band Lacuna Coil. It was released on 8 June 1999 through Century Media Records. In 2005, the album was re-released with new artwork and a new cover.

Track listing 
All arrangements by Lacuna Coil.

Personnel

Band members 
 Andrea Ferro – male vocals
 Cristina Scabbia – female vocals
 Cristiano "Pizza" Migliore – guitars
 Marco Coti Zelati – bass
 Cristiano "CriZ" Mozzati – drums

Additional musicians 
 Waldemar Sorychta – keyboards
 Valerie Lynch – lyrics adaptation

Production 
 Waldemar Sorychta – production, engineering
 Siggi Bemm & Waldemar Sorychta – engineering
 Wolfgang Bartsch – photography
 Carsten Drescher – layout & design

References 

Lacuna Coil albums
Century Media Records albums
1999 debut albums
Albums produced by Waldemar Sorychta